is a Japanese wrestler who competed in the Men's Freestyle 55 kg at the 2004 Summer Olympics and won the bronze medal.

Awards
Tokyo Sports
Wrestling Special Award (2004)

References

1975 births
Living people
Olympic wrestlers of Japan
Wrestlers at the 2000 Summer Olympics
Wrestlers at the 2004 Summer Olympics
Olympic bronze medalists for Japan
Nippon Sport Science University alumni
Olympic medalists in wrestling
Asian Games medalists in wrestling
Wrestlers at the 1998 Asian Games
Wrestlers at the 2002 Asian Games
Medalists at the 2004 Summer Olympics
Japanese male sport wrestlers
Medalists at the 2002 Asian Games
Asian Games silver medalists for Japan
20th-century Japanese people
21st-century Japanese people